Pop. 1280 is a crime novel by Jim Thompson, published in 1964.

Set in the fictional town of Pottsville, Texas during the early 1900s, the novel follows Nick Corey, a seemingly dim-witted sheriff whose pleasant exterior hides a scheming, psychopathic personality. He has a cynical view of the town he lives in and sees his duty as keeping up a thin veneer of respectability that allows everyone else to act as illicitly.

Critical reception has been largely positive. NPR's Stephen Marche described it as Thompson's "true masterpiece, a preposterously upsetting, ridiculously hilarious layer cake of nastiness, a romp through a world of nearly infinite deceit."

Plot
Pop. 1280 is the first-person narrative of Nick Corey, the listless sheriff of Potts County, the "47th (out of 47) largest county in the state". He lives in Pottsville which has a population of "1280 souls". The story takes place about the time of the Russian Revolution, in 1917-1918.

Sheriff Nick Corey presents himself as a genial fool, simplistic, over-accommodating, and harmless to a fault, given he is Pottsville's sole lawman. In reality, he is a clever psychopath able to manipulate people by appealing to their worst instincts and to get away with multiple murders.

The novel begins with Nick visiting Ken Lacey, the sheriff of a nearby county, ostensibly to ask for advice about two pimps who regularly insult and abuse him. Lacey mocks and belittles Nick, boasting that if any pimps tried to disrespect him, he would shoot them dead on the spot. Early that evening, Nick goes to see the two pimps. As they berate and mock him as usual, Nick fatally shoots them both, relying on the noise of a nearby steamboat whistle to cover the sound of his gun.

Sheriff Lacey comes to see Nick, having become concerned that Nick might actually kill the pimps and make Lacey an accessory. Nick reassures Lacey, then convinces him to visit the whorehouse run by the murdered pimps. As Nick walks him there, he manipulates Lacey into publicly repeating his boast that he would kill any pimp who disrespected him.

The next day, county attorney Robert Lee Jefferson berates Nick for never making any arrests. Jefferson warns Nick that he will face a strong opponent in the coming election from Sam Gaddis. Nick replies that the people don't really want him to do his job, that they enjoy petty crimes such as gambling, public drunkenness, and prostitution, and that if he started to arrest people for such crimes he would have to arrest the whole town. He agrees that Gaddis is a man of moral character "regardless of all the rumors," planting the seed for those rumors to spread.

Nick then goes to find Tom Hauck, the husband of Rose Hauck with whom Nick is having an affair. He finds Hauck drinking and fishing at the river and kills him with Hauck's own shotgun. Nick then tells Rose he has killed her husband; she is overjoyed, and they have passionate sex.

In addition to Rose, Nick is also having an affair with Amy Mason. Whereas Rose is foul-mouthed and hypocritical, Amy is the only person in Pottsville that is beyond Nick's manipulation, which makes her more appealing to Nick than either Rose or his wife Myra. Nick comes up with a way to get rid of Myra, her brother Lennie, and Rose all at once. He manipulates Rose into telling Lennie that she has seen him having sex with Myra. Unbeknownst to Nick, Myra really is sleeping with Lennie, and confronts Rose at her house. Rose shoots both Myra and Lennie dead.

Rose finally realizes the extent of her manipulation by Nick, but when she confronts him, he laughs at her and suggests that she flee town before her murders are discovered. Nick's inner monologue becomes increasingly delusional as he comes to believe he is Jesus Christ reincarnated to judge Pottsville. While the novel ends without Nick facing justice for any of his crimes, it becomes clear that he will soon descend into madness.

Themes
The character of a sheriff who plays the fool but is in reality highly intelligent is used several times by Thompson. Sometimes, as in this novel and The Killer Inside Me, the sheriff is a psychopath. In the novels Wild Town and The Transgressors, the sheriff is heroic, a highly intelligent man who was forced by circumstances to take a job that did not allow him to take full advantage of his abilities and who plays at being a clown to fit in to his role and to manipulate people for altruistic ends.

In his autobiography Bad Boy, Thompson wrote that this character was based on an actual deputy who pursued him when he neglected to pay a fine for being drunk and disturbing the peace. As recounted in a New York Times article, Thompson describes the encounter he had with the deputy: 

The sheriff also is quite likely based to some degree on Thompson's own father, who had many of the same characteristics: a born politician who knew just what to say to win favor with anyone and who appeared friendly on the outside but inside harbored a great deal of pent up rage and misanthropy.

Pop. 1280 is also one of Thompson's most overtly political books. Nick constantly uses jokes to point out the racism, classism, and sexism of American society, for example at the end of Nick's discussion with the county attorney who is after Nick to make more arrests when Nick promises to arrest anyone who breaks the law, "Providing o' course, that he's either colored or some poor white trash that can't pay his poll tax".

Adaptations
Pop. 1280 was adapted as the French film Coup de Torchon (1981), directed by Bertrand Tavernier, set in French West Africa in 1938.

Greek director Yorgos Lanthimos has been tapped to direct a new adaptation for release in 2020.

In popular culture
Pop. 1280 was referenced in the 1997 film Cop Land. The Garrison town sign reads: "Welcome To Garrison Population 1280". The director, James Mangold, is reputed to be a big fan of Jim Thompson.

References

External links
Pop. 1280 at Google Books

1964 American novels
American crime novels
Novels by Jim Thompson
Novels set in Texas
English-language novels
Fiction set in 1917
Hardboiled crime novels
Novels set in the 1910s
Fiction with unreliable narrators
Historical crime novels
American novels adapted into films
Gold Medal Books books